The finals and the qualifying heats of the men's 100 metre breaststroke event at the 1998 World Aquatics Championships were held on Monday 12 January 1998 in Perth, Western Australia.

A Final

B Final

Qualifying heats

See also
1996 Men's Olympic Games 100m Breaststroke (Atlanta)
1997 Men's World SC Championships 100m Breaststroke (Gothenburg)
1997 Men's European LC Championships 100m Breaststroke (Seville)
2000 Men's Olympic Games 100m Breaststroke (Sydney)

References

Swimming at the 1998 World Aquatics Championships